Raivo Kallas (born 2 December 1957 in Kingissepa) is an Estonian politician. He was a member of VIII Riigikogu.

References

Living people
1957 births
Members of the Riigikogu, 1995–1999
People from Kuressaare